Opernhaus station is a Nuremberg U-Bahn station, located on the U2 and U3.

References

Nuremberg U-Bahn stations
Railway stations in Germany opened in 1988
Buildings and structures completed in 1988
1988 establishments in West Germany